Judgmental language is a subset of red herring fallacies. It employs insulting, compromising or pejorative language to influence the recipient's judgment.

Examples
The surgeon general says that smoking is harmful to your health. Nowhere in the Bible is it said that you shouldn't smoke. So who are you gonna listen to, some quack or the Lord God Almighty?

This argument combines judgmental language with non sequitur and appeal to authority.

Conscription is the only working way to have a reliable and efficient army. We are far safer when we are defended by our very own sons than by some mercenaries, who will just fight for pay.

Here the judgmental words are "our very own sons" and "mercenaries", which imply not only professional soldiers but rather soldiers of fortune. This argument is also a false dilemma: nothing implies that coercion and fear of punishment produces better soldiers than voluntarily, and that a professional army could not be assembled from the nation's own citizens.

It is related to pejorative language, which is a form of fallacy.

See also 
 Logic
 Weasel words

References

Informal fallacies